Cloudcroft is a village in Otero County, New Mexico, United States, and is located within the Lincoln National Forest. The population was 674 at the 2010 census. Despite being located in an otherwise arid region, its high elevation (one of the highest in the U.S.) allows for a mild summer that makes it a popular tourist attraction in west Texas and southern New Mexico. It was named by Fodor's in 2002 as the Number 3 "Most Overlooked and Underrated Destination Spot."  Tourism remains the primary economic driver of the village.

History

In the 1890s, the El Paso and Northeastern Railroad, organized by brothers Charles Bishop Eddy and John Arthur Eddy, arrived in the newly founded town of Alamogordo intending to continue the rail line north to the mining town of White Oaks and beyond. This required a steady supply of timber. In 1898 the Eddy brothers sent a survey crew into the Sacramento Mountains to determine the feasibility of extending a line up the summit to harvest the forests. The crew reported that not only was it possible, but the area could attract visitors. The name of Cloudcroft – a pasture for the clouds – was suggested and work on the line soon began.

By the end of the year, the rail line had been extended as far as Toboggan Canyon, and construction was started on a pavilion at the summit to provide accommodations for the anticipated tourists. It consisted of a dining room, kitchen, parlor, entertainment hall, and 40 tents set on wooden platforms. In May 1899 the railroad reached Cox Canyon and in June 1899, "The Pavilion" was formally opened by John Eddy. The first visitors rode the train as far as Toboggan and finished the journey by stagecoach. Favorable reports in newspapers quickly made Cloudcroft a popular destination. An additional resort, The Lodge, was built as a more upscale alternative to The Pavilion. The rail line arrived in Cloudcroft in early 1900, and in June 1900 the train depot was finished, located just west of The Pavilion. Meeting the trains became a daily activity in the village, with three arriving each day, bringing lumber, mail, and passengers.

In 1909, The Lodge burned down; it was rebuilt at its present location in 1911. The Pavilion also burned twice in the 1920s, but was rebuilt each time to conform to the original plans.

The Lodge at Cloudcroft hosted numerous famous guests, including Judy Garland, Gilbert Roland, Clark Gable, and Pancho Villa. In the 1930s the resort was managed by Conrad Hilton, who was born and raised in San Antonio, New Mexico. Hilton was familiar with The Lodge and wanted to be closer to his family as his own hotel chain slowly began its climb to prominence.

As automobiles grew in popularity, the rail line began to lose money. Passenger service ended in 1938, and the last freight train ran in 1947. Since then, tourism in Cloudcroft has grown beyond The Lodge and Pavilion to Burro Street near Highway 82, where many small shops and restaurants are located.

The Mexican Canyon Trestle is a surviving example of the now defunct rail line that once ran up the mountain from Alamogordo to Cloudcroft. It is located off Highway 82 just under one mile west of Cloudcroft.

Cloudcroft business district fire 
An early morning fire on Monday, December 13, 2010, in Cloudcroft destroyed two downtown buildings and caused smoke damage to several other businesses along Burro Avenue, Cloudcroft's main street and a tourist attraction.

The 100-year-old Pine Stump Mall building, housing numerous businesses on the boardwalk, burned to the ground, while the Copper Butterfly building, gutted by the fire, left the building's walls standing without a roof.  Later that day, fire crews were forced to demolish the Copper Butterfly because of fire damage.

Cloudcroft Mayor Dave Venable, owner of the Pine Stump Mall, said no one was injured in the fire and the buildings were unoccupied at the time of the blaze, which began around 4 a.m. The elimination of six businesses and related jobs just before Christmas was a serious economic loss to the community.

New Mexico TV station KRQE first broke the story on Twitter which quickly became a source of updates through the day on the fire, including Cloudcroft Webcam which happened to be directed at Burro Avenue and the affected area.

The cause of the fire was undetermined as of the day of the fire. Later investigation suggested that an electrical short, possibly related to holiday decorations, sparked the initial fire.

Geography
Cloudcroft is located along US Route 82 approximately 13 miles east of Alamogordo.

Climate
The climate of Cloudcroft and the Sacramento Mountains is cooler and receives more precipitation and snowfall than the surrounding areas in West Texas and southern New Mexico.

Cloudcroft meets the criteria of a humid continental climate (Köppen: Dfb), if the  coldest-month isotherm is used. It is the southernmost urban area on the North American continent with such a climatic subtype.

Demographics

As of the census of 2000, there were 749 people, 320 households, and 224 families residing in the village. The population density was 500.2 people per square mile (192.8/km2). There were 920 housing units at an average density of 614.4 per square mile (236.8/km2). The racial makeup of the village was 90.66% White, 0.80% Native American, 0.53% Asian, 3.47% from other races, and 2.54% from two or more races. Hispanic or Latino of any race were 14.59% of the population.

There were 320 households, out of which 29.7% had children under the age of 18 living with them, 58.1% were married couples living together, 7.8% had a female householder with no husband present, and 30.0% were non-families. 26.3% of all households were made up of individuals, and 8.4% had someone living alone who was 65 years of age or older. The average household size was 2.34 and the average family size was 2.82.

In the village, the population was spread out, with 24.3% under the age of 18, 4.5% from 18 to 24, 24.4% from 25 to 44, 31.4% from 45 to 64, and 15.4% who were 65 years of age or older. The median age was 43 years. For every 100 females, there were 98.1 males. For every 100 females age 18 and over, there were 96.2 males.

The median income for a household in the village was $40,795, and the median income for a family was $52,292. Males had a median income of $40,750 versus $27,083 for females. The per capita income for the village was $21,301. About 8.7% of families and 9.9% of the population were below the poverty line, including 14.0% of those under age 18 and 5.2% of those age 65 or over.

Events

Cloudcroft is home to three festivals, each taking place at Zenith Park. Various arts and crafts are sold from local and regional artists, live music and entertainment is provided, activities and competitions are held, and local civic groups and churches sell traditional fair food. May Fair is seen as the kickoff of the summer tourist season on Memorial Day Weekend. The weekend following 4th of July is the July Jamboree, the smallest and newest of the three festivals. In October, the third and final event, Oktoberfest, is celebrated. It has an autumn atmosphere with the local aspen groves turning golden rather than a traditional German Oktoberfest. Oktoberfest is seen as a final outdoor event before the winter snows and the close of the traditional tourist season.

Education
It is in Cloudcroft Municipal Schools.

Transportation
 U.S. Route 82

Nearby towns and cities
 Alamogordo, west of the town along U.S. Route 82
 Holloman Air Force Base, west of the town, just past Alamogordo
 Roswell, northeast of the town
 Ruidoso, northeast of the town
 Carlsbad, southeast of the town
 Sunspot, south of the town along Sunspot Highway

Notable people
 Ronny Cox, actor, singer, songwriter, and storyteller

See also

 List of municipalities in New Mexico
 Lincoln National Forest

References

External links

 Cloudcroft Chamber of Commerce

Villages in Otero County, New Mexico
Villages in New Mexico
Populated places established in 1899